Piaçabuçu is a municipality located in the Brazilian state of Alagoas. It is the southernmost municipality in Alagoas, and lies near both São Francisco River and the Atlantic Ocean. Its population was 17,848 (2020) and its area is 240 km².

References

Populated places established in 1832
Populated coastal places in Alagoas
Municipalities in Alagoas
1832 establishments in Brazil